The 2022 All-Ireland Under-20 Hurling Championship was the fourth staging of the All-Ireland Under-20 Championship and the 58th staging overall of a hurling championship for players between the minor and senior grades. The championship began on 2 April 2022 and ended on 22 May 2022.

Cork entered the championship as defending champions in search of a third successive title, however, they were beaten by Tipperary in the Munster semi-final.

The final was played on 22 May 2022 at Semple Stadium in Thurles, between Kilkenny and Limerick, in what was their first meeting in a final in five years. Kilkenny won the match by 0-19 to 0-18 to claim their 12th championship title overall and a first title since 2008.

Kilkenny's Billy Drennan was the championship's top scorer with 1-40.

Format change

For the first time in its history, the Munster Under-20 Championship replaced its traditional straight knockout format with a group stage. This guaranteed all teams at least two games. The All-Ireland semi-finals, which featured the defeated provincial finalists in 2018 and 2019, will be discontinued.

Fixtures/results

Leinster Under-20 Hurling Championship

Leinster round 1

Leinster round 2

Leinster quarter-finals

Leinster semi-finals

Leinster final

Munster Under-20 Hurling Championship

Munster group stage

Group 1 table 

{| class="wikitable" style="text-align:center"
!width=20|
!width=150 style="text-align:left;"|Team
!width=20|
!width=20|
!width=20|
!width=20|
!width=30|
!width=30|
!width=20|
!width=20|
|- 
|- align=center style="background:#ACE1AF;" 
|1||align=left| Limerick ||2||2||0||0||44||37||7||4
|- 
|- align=center style="background:#ACE1AF;" 
|2||align=left| Cork ||2||1||0||1||44||48||-4||2
|- 
|-
|3||align=left| Clare ||2||0||0||2||35||38||-3||0
|}

Group 1 fixtures

Group 2 table 

{| class="wikitable" style="text-align:center"
!width=20|
!width=150 style="text-align:left;"|Team
!width=20|
!width=20|
!width=20|
!width=20|
!width=30|
!width=30|
!width=20|
!width=20|
|- 
|- align=center style="background:#ACE1AF;" 
|1||align=left| Tipperary ||2||2||0||0||51||36||15||4
|- align=center style="background:#ACE1AF;"  
|2||align=left| Waterford ||2||1||0||1||55||42||13||2
|- 
|-
|3||align=left| Kerry ||2||0||0||2||28||56||-28||0
|}

Group 2 fixtures

Munster semi-finals

Munster final

All-Ireland Under-20 Hurling Championship Final

All-Ireland final

Championship statistics

Top scorers

Top scorers overall

Top scorers in a single game

References

Under-20
All-Ireland Under-20 Hurling Championship